Brendan Hannigan is cofounder and CEO of Sonrai Security and entrepreneur partner at Polaris Partners.  He is a former head of International Business Machines (IBM) Security Systems Division, chairman of Twistlock and CEO of Q1 Labs.  He is also an entrepreneur and an investor who focuses on security, cloud, and  software as a service (SaaS) startups.

Background 
Hannigan was born in Ireland where he finished a BSc in Computer Science at the University College at Dublin in 1987. At school, he became interested with FORTRAN programming on a VAX computer architecture and that started his interest and career in technology.

He immigrated to the United States in the early 1990s. He first lived in Boston, Massachusetts and secured employment at Motorola.

Career 
Hannigan started working in Ireland where he worked for Digital Equipment. His job at Digital involved writing terminal server and routing code. When he relocated to the U.S., he joined Motorola as a software engineer and subsequently Wellfleet Communications. He also worked for Forrester Research from 1996 to 2000 as Director of network research and implemented successful practices in the areas of enterprise networks, security technology, and product management.

Hannigan was, however, known as the President and CEO of Q1 Labs, which was acquired by IBM in 2011. The company, provided security intelligence software that analyzed and monitored events. In an interview, he said, "Our ideas are based on the simple realization that the perimeter protection paradigm that companies have relied on doesn't work in a world where the bad actors are so sophisticated. Built upon a foundation of intelligence, we must bring security closer to the data, person, and transaction.” The Q1 Labs' QRadar product was seen as compatible with IBM's existing products and central to its security strategy, hence the acquisition.

When IBM acquired Q1 Labs, the company created a new division, IBM Security,  that focused on helping clients address security challenges. Q1 Labs formed the basis of this security division and Hannigan was tapped to lead it. According to Gartner, that division has established itself as the third largest enterprise security software company, and IDC lists Hannigan's group as a world leader in security services. IBM would later acquire startups that reinforced the division's range of security services.

Hannigan retired from IBM in 2016 after four years working for the company. He went on to co-found Sonrai Security.

Startup ventures 
In November 2016, Hannigan joined Polaris Partners as an entrepreneur partner and was involved in identifying tech startups for funding and founding. As with his experience at IBM, he focuses on cloud infrastructure and cybersecurity. Hannigan maintains that the business world is shifting from the traditional data center towards multiple cloud services. In 2019, he co-founded Sonrai Security, a startup that offers organizations better data security across multicloud deployments through a software-as-a-service product offering. Aside from being an investor, he also serves as the CEO of the startup, which was able to raise over $88 million.

References 

Living people
Year of birth missing (living people)
Irish emigrants to the United States
Alumni of University College Dublin
IBM employees
Computer security specialists